Volodymyr Kogut (born 28 July 1984) is a Ukrainian former road and track cyclist. He competed in the team pursuit event and omnium event at the 2013 UCI Track Cycling World Championships.

Major results
2014
 3rd National Time Trial Championships
 9th Race Horizon Park 1
2016
 1st  National Team Pursuit Championships

References

External links
 

1984 births
Living people
Ukrainian track cyclists
Ukrainian male cyclists
Sportspeople from Mykolaiv